Berberis standleyi is a shrub in the Berberidaceae described as a species in 1952. It was published with the name Mahonia glauca, a very different plant from Berberis glauca. Thus if one desires to consider Berberis and Mahonia as one genus instead of two, it is necessary to use a different name, i.e. Berberis standleyi.

The species is endemic to Honduras.

References

standleyi
Flora of Honduras
Plants described in 1952